To hear something through the grapevine or on the grapevine is to learn about something via an informal source or hearsay, from another person; it may refer to an overheard conversation or anonymous sources of information. An Australian term used in rural Australia for the spreading of news or gossip through informal networks is the bush telegraph.

Etymology
One explanation for through or on the grapevine says that the phrase is based on the appearance of the thousands of kilometres of telegraph wire installed across the US during the 19th century, strung together by telegraph poles, which resembled the strings used to train grapevines. Rumours were frequently spread using the telegraph system during the American Civil War.

In his autobiography Up From Slavery, Booker T. Washington says that slaves in the South kept up-to-date on current events by "what was termed the 'grape-vine' telegraph":

The New York Public Library contends that the phrase derives from the infamous Grapevine Tavern in New York City's Greenwich Village. During the Civil War it "...was a popular hangout of Union officers and Confederate spies... It was the ideal place to get news and information, or in the case of spies and politicians, the ideal place to spread rumors and gossip, leading to the popular phrase 'heard it through the grapevine'".

In popular culture
The term gained a boost in popularity through its use in the Motown song "I Heard It Through the Grapevine", a major hit single for both Marvin Gaye and Gladys Knight & the Pips in the late 1960s.

See also
Rumor
Organizational communication

References

Further reading 
Clegg, Stewart R., et al. The SAGE Handbook of Organization Studies. SAGE Publications, 2006.
"Heard It Through the Grapevine". (February 10, 1997). Forbes, pp. 22

Papa, Michael J., Tom D. Daniels and Barry K. Spiker. Organizational Communication: Perspective and Trends. SAGE Publications, 2008.
Porterfield, Donald F. "Organizational Communication Developments from 1960 to the Present." The Journal of Business Communication (n.d.): 18-23.
Robbins, Stephen; Essentials of Organizational Behavior (8th ed.) New Jersey: Pearson Prentice Hall. .
Rogelberd, Steven G.; "Encyclopedia of Industrial and Organizational Psychology"; SAGE Publications, 2007: 556-557
Spillan, John E., Mary Mino and M. Susan Rowles. "Sharing Organizational Messages Through Effective Lateral Communication." Qualitative Research Reports in Communication (2002): 96-104.

Rhetorical techniques